Maloja Pushbikers is a German cycling team that was founded in 2014. In 2020, the squad became a UCI Continental team for the first time.

Team roster

Major wins
2022
Stage 2 Belgrade Banjaluka, Filippo Fortin

References

External links

UCI Continental Teams (Europe)
Cycling teams based in Germany
Cycling teams established in 2014